Findley Lake may refer to:

Findley Lake (lake), Chautauqua County, New York
Findley Lake, New York, a hamlet on the lake
Lake Findley, a lake in Texas